Calm Lake is a community in Ontario, located in the Rainy River District.

Communities in Rainy River District